The Bancolombia Open was a professional tennis tournament played on outdoor red clay courts. It was part of the Association of Tennis Professionals (ATP) Challenger Tour. It was held annually in Bogotá, Colombia, from 1994 (as an ATP World Series tournament from 1994 to 1997, as an ATP International Series tournament from 1998 to 2001, and as a Challenger from 2004 to 2010).

David Rikl, and Sebastián Prieto have won most title in doubles, two, and so has Horacio Zeballos in singles titles. The Argentinian was also the only player to win in both singles and doubles the same year.

Past finals

Singles

Doubles

External links
 ITF Search
 Official website

 
Bancolombia Open
ATP Challenger Tour
Clay court tennis tournaments
Tennis tournaments in Colombia